The Cuatro Cienegas shiner (Cyprinella xanthicara) is a species of freshwater fish in the family Cyprinidae.

Distribution
The small fish is endemic to the springs and marshes of the Cuatro Ciénegas and Cuatrociénegas Municipality area of Coahuila state in northeastern Mexico.

It is an Endangered species.

References

 
Jelks, H.L., S.J. Walsh, N.M. Burkhead, S. Contreras-Balderas, E. Díaz-Pardo, D.A. Hendrickson, J. Lyons, N.E. Mandrak, F. McCormick, J.S. Nelson, S.P. Platania, B.A. Porter, C.B. Renaud, J.J. Schmitter-Soto, E.B. Taylor and M.L. Warren Jr., 2008. Conservation status of imperiled North American freshwater and diadromous fishes. Fisheries 33(8):372-407.

Cyprinella
Shiner, Cuatro Cienegas
Shiner, Cuatro Cienegas
Cuatrociénegas Municipality
Natural history of Coahuila
Shiner, Cuatro Cienegas
Shiner, Cuatro Cienegas
Endangered fauna of North America
Taxa named by Wendell L. Minckley
Taxa named by Glady Lou Lytle
Fish described in 1969
Taxonomy articles created by Polbot
Mexican Plateau